Callochiton empleurus is a species of chiton in the family Callochitonidae.

References
 Powell A. W. B., New Zealand Mollusca, William Collins Publishers Ltd, Auckland, New Zealand 1979 

Callochitonidae
Chitons of New Zealand
Taxa named by Frederick Hutton (scientist)
Molluscs described in 1872